The Cedars Lock and Dam Historic District is a district in Little Chute, Wisconsin, United States. It is named after the Cedars Lock, found in the district. The lock took its name from the Treaty of the Cedars. In 1993 the district was added to the National Register of Historic Places for its significance in engineering and transport.

References

External links
Historic American Engineering Record (HAER) documentation, filed under Little Chute, Outagamie County, WI:

Dams on the National Register of Historic Places in Wisconsin
Historic American Engineering Record in Wisconsin
Historic districts on the National Register of Historic Places in Wisconsin
Locks on the National Register of Historic Places in Wisconsin
National Register of Historic Places in Outagamie County, Wisconsin